Ekwusigo is a Local Government Area in Anambra State, south-central Nigeria. Towns that make up the local government are Ozubulu, Oraifite, Ichi and Ihembosi.

Schools
Here is the list of secondary schools in Ekwusigo Local Government Area:
 Community Secondary School, Ichi
 Union Secondary School, Ichi (Gss)
 Community Secondary School, Ihembosi
 Boys’ Secondary School, Oraifite
 Girls’ Secondary School, Oraifite
 Community Secondary School, Ozubulu
 Girls Secondary School, Ozubulu
 Zixton Secondary School, Ozubulu

Notable people
 Azuka Okwuosa – former Anambra State Commissioner for Works and Transport.
 (Sir Emeka Offor)
Outstanding youths like
(Engr Michael Nwosu)-

References
LOCAL GOVERNMENT AREAS IN ANAMBRA STATE dated July 21, 2007; accessed October 4, 2007

Local Government Areas in Anambra State
Local Government Areas in Igboland